James Mark Borgman (born February 24, 1954) is an American cartoonist. He is known for his political cartoons and his nationally syndicated comic strip Zits. He was the editorial cartoonist at The Cincinnati Enquirer from 1976 to 2008.

Biography
Borgman was born in Cincinnati, Ohio to James and Marian Borgman, where he began his career in journalism as a student at Elder High School. He then attended Ohio's Kenyon College where he started as an English major, then switched to being an art major. He graduated in 1976 with Phi Beta Kappa honors.

Borgman met his first wife Lynn Goodwin during his senior year of college at a class called Jesus and the Gospels.  They had two children named Dylan and Chelsea. Lynn died in 1999 from a blood clot following surgery to ease chronic neck and shoulder pain. In 2003 he married Suzanne Soled, an educational psychologist and professor at Northern Kentucky University.

Career
At Kenyon College, Borgman drew editorial cartoons for the Kenyon Collegian.

He became The Cincinnati Enquirers editorial cartoonist in 1976. Since 1980, his editorial cartoons have been nationally syndicated, at first by King Features Syndicate.  In 2007, Universal Press Syndicate took over the distribution of his editorial cartoons. In 2008, he took a voluntary buyout offered by Enquirer parent Gannett Company but continued to work on Zits after leaving the paper.

Comic strip series

Wonk City
His body of work has included the weekly comic strip Wonk City, which ran from 1994 to 1996 on the editorial pages of The Washington Post.  A surreal send-up of inside-the-beltway mores during the administration of Bill Clinton, many of the cartoons featured a cat involved in behind-the-scenes political skullduggery.

Zits

While on vacation in Sedona, Arizona, Borgman met up with fellow cartoonist, Jerry Scott.  Scott pitched the idea of a cartoon about a teenager and thus the comic strip Zits was born, debuting in July, 1997, with Borgman cartooning and Scott writing.

Zits is syndicated in over 1500 newspapers around the world and is translated into nine languages, including German, Chinese, Swedish, Norwegian, Danish, Spanish, Dutch, Portuguese, Finnish and Polish.

Awards
In 1991, when Borgman was 37 years old, he won the Pulitzer Prize for Editorial Cartooning. He has also won the National Cartoonist Society Editorial Cartoon Award for 1986, 1987, 1988, 1994, and 2006, their Newspaper Comic Strip for 1997, their Newspaper Comic Strip (with Jerry Scott) in 1998 and 1999 for Zits, and their Reuben Award in 1993.

Borgman also won the Reuben Award for editorial cartooning in 2006, and has achieved a great deal of recognition for his work.

References

Further reading

External links
 
 
Billy Ireland Cartoon Library & Museum Art Database

1954 births
Living people
American comic strip cartoonists
American editorial cartoonists
Pulitzer Prize for Editorial Cartooning winners
Artists from Cincinnati
Reuben Award winners
Kenyon College alumni
The Cincinnati Enquirer people
Elder High School alumni